Coleophora arta is a moth of the family Coleophoridae that can be found in China and Mongolia.

References

External links

arta
Moths of Asia
Moths described in 1979